The Mohak Line is an electrified standard-gauge freight-only secondary line of the Korean State Railway in South P'yŏngan Province, North Korea, running from Taegŏn on the Ŭnsan Line to Mohak, where it serves the large Sunch'ŏn Cement Complex.

Route

References

Railway lines in North Korea
Standard gauge railways in North Korea